The  is a branch of the Tokugawa clan based in Mito, Ibaraki.

History 
Following the establishment of the Tokugawa shogunate in 1603, Tokugawa Ieyasu appointed his eleventh son, Tokugawa Yorifusa, as daimyō in 1610. With his appointment, Yorifusa became the founding member of the Mito branch of the Tokugawa clan.  Along with the Tokugawa branches in Kii and Owari, the Mito branch represented one of three Tokugawa houses known as the Gosanke ("three honourable houses of the Tokugawa").

Although the Mito branch held less land and wealth than either of the other two branches, they maintained considerable influence throughout the Edo period. Mito Domain's promiximity to the de facto capital in Edo was a contributing factor to this power as well as the fact that many people unofficially considered the Mito daimyō to be "vice-shōgun". The Mito branch however, as the lowest of the gosanke, was not eligible for the shōgun rank.

Tokugawa Mitsukuni, the third son of Tokugawa Yorifusa, became the second daimyō of Mito in 1661.  Mitsukuni further established Mito's status as a respected han by sponsoring the Dai Nihonshi in 1657.  The endeavor would launch Mito's reputation as a center for intellectual thought.

The treasures of the Mito branch are kept in The Tokugawa Museum (彰考館徳川博物館) in Mito.

From July 2009 he is also the director of Mito's Tokugawa Museum. He presently works for Tokio Marine & Nichido Fire Insurance Co., Ltd. A Tokyo resident, he commutes to Mito during weekends.

Heads
 Tokugawa Yorifusa (1603-1661)
 Tokugawa Mitsukuni (1628-1701)
 Tokugawa Tsunaeda (1656-1718)
 Tokugawa Munetaka (1705-1730)
 Tokugawa Munemoto (1728-1766)
 Tokugawa Harumori (1751-1805)
 Tokugawa Harutoshi (1773-1816)
 Tokugawa Narinobu (1797-1829)
 Tokugawa Nariaki (1800-1860)
 Tokugawa Yoshiatsu (1832-1868)
 Tokugawa Akitake (1853-1910)
 Tokugawa Atsuyoshi (1855-1898)
 Tokugawa Kuniyuki (1886-1969)
 Tokugawa Kuninari (1912-1986)
 Tokugawa Narimasa (b. 1958)

Family tree

References

External links